Don Juan Quilligan is a 1945 American comedy film directed by Frank Tuttle and written by Frank Gabrielson and Arthur Kober. The film stars William Bendix, Joan Blondell, Phil Silvers, Anne Revere, B.S. Pully and Mary Treen. The film was released on June 1, 1945, by 20th Century Fox.

Plot

Cast   
William Bendix as Patrick Michael 'Don Juan' Quilligan
Joan Blondell as Marjorie Mossrock
Phil Silvers as 'Mac' MacDenny
Anne Revere as Mrs. Cora Rostigaff
B.S. Pully as Ed Mossrock
Mary Treen as Lucy Blake
John Russell as Howie Mossrock
Veda Ann Borg as Beattle LaRue
Thurston Hall as Judge at murder trial
Cara Williams as Fifth Ave. Florist salesgirl
Richard Gaines as Defense attorney
Hobart Cavanaugh as Mr. Rostigaff

References

External links 
 

1945 films
1940s English-language films
20th Century Fox films
American comedy films
1945 comedy films
Films directed by Frank Tuttle
Films scored by David Raksin
American black-and-white films
1940s American films